Sir James Langham, 2nd Baronet  (c. 1621 – 22 August 1699) of Cottesbrook, Northamptonshire was an English politician who sat in the House of Commons at various times between 1656 and 1662.

Langham was the eldest son of Sir John Langham, 1st Baronet and his wife Mary Bunce. He was educated at Emmanuel College, Cambridge, where he matriculated in 1638, and was admitted to Lincoln's Inn in 1640 to train for the law. He was knighted in 1660 and appointed Sheriff of Northamptonshire for 1664.

In 1656, Langham was elected Member of Parliament for Northamptonshire in the Second Protectorate Parliament. He was elected MP for Northampton in 1659 for the Third Protectorate Parliament. In 1661, Langham was elected Member of Parliament for Northampton in the Cavalier Parliament but the election was declared void on 13 June. Langham was again elected MP for Northampton in February 1662 but the election was also declared void on 26 April 1662. 
 
Langham inherited the baronetcy on the death of his father in 1671. He was elected a Fellow of the Royal Society in 1678.

Langham married four times, his first wife being Mary Alston, the daughter of Sir Edward Alston, his second wife Elizabeth, the daughter of Ferdinando Hastings, 6th Earl of Huntingdon, his third wife Penelope, the daughter of John Holles, 2nd Earl of Clare and his fourth wife Dorothy, the daughter of John Pomeroy of Devon.

He died at Kensington and was buried at Cottesbrooke, Northamptonshire, leaving no male children. He was succeeded in the baronetcy by his brother William. His daughter married Henry Booth, 1st Earl of Warrington.

References

History of Parliament -  LANGHAM, Sir James (c.1621-99), of Lincoln's Inn Fields, Mdx. and Cottesbrooke, Northants.

 

1620s births
1699 deaths
People from Cottesbrooke
People from Northampton
Alumni of Emmanuel College, Cambridge
Members of Lincoln's Inn
High Sheriffs of Northamptonshire
Baronets in the Baronetage of England
Place of birth missing
Year of birth uncertain
Fellows of the Royal Society
English MPs 1656–1658
English MPs 1659
English MPs 1661–1679